The South West Women's Football League is at the fifth and sixth levels of the English women's football pyramid, with the seven other Regional Leagues – Eastern, London & SE, Southern, West Mids, East Mids, North East and North West. The South West Regional Women's Football League feeds directly into the FA Women's National League Division 1 South West, and lies above the Cornwall Women's Football League, Devon Women's Football League, Dorset Women's Football League, Gloucestershire County Womens Football League, Wiltshire FA Women's Football League and Somerset Women's Football League in the pyramid. The pyramid structure was founded in 1998.

Below the Premier Division the two Division Ones are split geographically with Division One East and Division One West.

Exeter City Ladies were crowned the 2018-19 champions of the Premier League following a 3-1 win over Keynsham Town Development on the 15th of April 2019.

Lakeside Athletic Ladies were promoted from the Devon Women’s League as runners up in 2018/19.

2021-22 Season 
The premier division was won by AFC St Austell Ladies 1st who finished on 45 points with a record of 14-3-1. Their promotion means they will be playing in the FA Women's National League South. 

The northern division was won by Bristol Rovers Women First who finished on 43 points with a record of 14-1-1. They have gained promotion to the Premier Division. 

The western division was won by Liskeard Athletic Women FC First who are currently top of the league with one game to play. Their record is currently 10-2-2 and they have 32 points. 

The eastern division was won by Warminster Town Ladies who are top of the league with one game to play. Their record stands currently at 13-2-2 as they top the league on 41 points.

Teams
The teams competing in the league for the 2022–23 season are:

Premier Division

Eastern Division

Northern Division

Western Division

External links

 

5